is Japan's nationwide free-to-air shortwave commercial radio station. It started broadcast on August 27, 1954. Radio Nikkei 2 started broadcast on September 2, 1963.

Radio Nikkei's headquarters are located at Kotohira Tower, 2-8 Toranomon 1-chōme, Minato, Tokyo.  Its headquarters was previously at 9-15 Akasaka 1-chōme, Minato, Tokyo.

Background
The headquarters and the main studio are located at Kotohira Tower at Toranomon, Minato, Tokyo. It also has its branch office in Ōtemae, Chūō-ku, Osaka.

Along with the headquarters' studio, the studios in Tokyo are inside the Tokyo Stock Exchange and two other public satellite studios. In Osaka, it also has studios in the branch office and a satellite studio.

Besides its shortwave coverage Radio Nikkei is also available on mobile phones and online through Radiko – the platform accessible only from Japan, due to geo-blocking of non-Japanese IP addresses.

Programming
The language is almost exclusively in Japanese except an English language learning programme.

The station features the following four genres as the core of its programming: finance, JRA horse racing (weekends), health-medical, and culture.

Radio Nikkei 1 is for general programs and eastern Japan horse-racing coverage. Radio Nikkei 2 is for live company stock price announcement and western Japan horse-racing coverage. Radio Nikkei 2's programming on weekdays is named RN2 which is aimed for businesspersons at their 30s and 40s with music programs.

Although Radio Nikkei is a member of Nikkei Media Group, its programming does not have a strong connection with the group's television networks, TXN and Nikkei CNBC.

Frequencies, beam, modulation and hours
From its transmitting stations in Nagara, Chiba and Nemuro, Hokkaidō, it transmits on the following frequencies, power and call signs.

Radio Nikkei 1:
3.925 MHz/50 kW (JOZ); 10 kW (JOZ4): JOZ, JOZ4
6.055 MHz/50 kW: JOZ2
9.595 MHz/50 kW: JOZ3
Radio Nikkei 2:
3.945 MHz/10 kW: JOZ5
6.115 MHz/50 kW: JOZ6
9.76 MHz/50 kW: JOZ7

The horizontal dipole antennas radiate towards the northeast and the southwest direction, which would cover the Japanese archipelago.

As of June 2007, its shortwave transmissions are in an ordinary amplitude modulation: double sideband full carrier (A3E).

Radio Nikkei 1 begins at 05:40 in Japan Standard Time (JST), 20:40 (the day before) in the UTC and ends at 22:30JST=13:30UTC (Mondays to Thursdays), 23:30JST=14:30UTC (Fridays), 23:15JST=14:15UTC (Saturdays) and 21:00JST=12:00UTC (Sundays).

Radio Nikkei 2 begins at 08:00JST=23:00UTC and ends at 16:30JST=07:30UTC (Mondays to Fridays), 18:00=09:00UTC (Saturdays and Sundays).

The schedule changes subject to program availability.

References
 (Japanese) Radio Nikkei Schedule.

External links
 (Japanese) Radio Nikkei

Mass media companies based in Tokyo
Radio in Japan
Nikkei Inc.
Japanese radio networks
Radio stations established in 1954
1954 establishments in Japan
News and talk radio stations
Sports radio stations
Shortwave radio stations